Staroye Petrovskoye is a rural locality (a village) in Almozerskoye Rural Settlement, Vytegorsky District, Vologda Oblast, Russia. The population was 41 as of 2002.

Geography 
Staroye Petrovskoye is located 44 km southeast of Vytegra (the district's administrative centre) by road. Verkhny Rubezh is the nearest rural locality.

References 

Rural localities in Vytegorsky District